Amata pleurosticta is a moth of the subfamily Arctiinae. It was described by George Hampson in 1898. It is found on Borneo. The habitat consists of lowland areas.

Adults are small and have transparent patches on their wings.

References

Pleuro
Moths of Borneo
Moths described in 1898